Mohammad Shahid (11 November 1948 – 12 December 2014) was an Indian cricketer. He played in 64 first-class cricket matches for Railways and Uttar Pradesh.

References

External links
 

1948 births
2014 deaths
Indian cricketers
Railways cricketers
Uttar Pradesh cricketers
Sportspeople from Aligarh